The Tughlaq dynasty (also known as Tughluq or Tughluk dynasty) was a Muslim dynasty which ruled over the Delhi sultanate in medieval India. Its reign started in 1320 in Delhi when Ghazi Malik assumed the throne under the title of Ghiyath al-Din Tughluq. The dynasty ended in 1413.

The dynasty expanded its territorial reach through a military campaign led by Muhammad ibn Tughluq, and reached its zenith between 1330 and 1335. It ruled most of the Indian subcontinent.

Origin 

The etymology of the word Tughlaq is not certain. The 16th-century writer Firishta claims that it is a corruption of the Turkic term Qutlugh, but this is doubtful. Literary, numismatic and epigraphic evidence makes it clear that Tughlaq was not an ancestral designation, but the personal name of the dynasty's founder Ghazi Malik. Historians use the designation Tughlaq to describe the entire dynasty as a matter of convenience, but to call it the Tughlaq dynasty is inaccurate, as none of the dynasty's kings not used Tughlaq as a surname: only Ghiyath al-Din's son Muhammad bin Tughluq called himself the son of Tughlaq Shah ("bin Tughlaq").

The ancestry of the dynasty is debated among modern historians because the earlier sources provide different information regarding it. Tughlaq's court poet Badr-i Chach attempted to find a royal Sassanian genealogy for the dynasty from the line of Bahram Gur, which seems to be the official position of the genealogy of the Sultan, although this can be dismissed as flattery. 

Peter Jackson suggested that Tughlaq was of Mongol stock and a follower of the Mongol chief Alaghu. The Moroccan traveler Ibn Battuta states that the Sufi saint Rukn-e-Alam claimed that Tughluq belonged to the "Qarauna" [Neguderi] tribe of Turks, who lived in the hilly region between Turkestan and Sindh, who were infact Mongols. In addition to the fact that Barani was not corroborated by contemporary sources, Tughlaq's hateful attitude towards the Mongols make it highly doubtful that he had any ethnic relation to the Qaraunas and Mongols, he expressed hatred and a drive to cleanse the countryside of them ("I love my Dipalpur, for me, my sword and the heads of the Mongols"). It is doubtful that Shaikh Rukn-ud-Din knew anything about the obscure origins of Tughlaq, and as he was not an eye-witness, his statement cannot be regarded as authentic.

According to Bhandari and Firishta, Tughlaq was born in Punjab to a Punjabi mother. Another of Tughlaq's court poet Amir Khusrau in his Tughlaq Nama neglects any mention of Tughlaq's arrival in India from a foreign land, presuming he was born in India. His own court poet states that Tughluq described himself frankly as a man of no importance ("awara mard") in his early life and career, something that all of his audience knew. Tughlaq Nama declares Tughlaq to have been a minor chief of humble origins. Ferishta, based on inquiries at Lahore, wrote that the knowledgeable historians and the books of India had neglected to mention any clear statement on the origin of the dynasty, but wrote that there was a rural founding myth that Tughlaq's father was a Turkic slave of Balban who married daughter of Jatt chieftain of Punjab. However there is no contemporary sources corroborate this statement. The historian Fouzia Ahmed points out that as per the Tughlaq Nama, Tughlaq was not a Balbanid slave because he was not part of the old Turkic nobility, as his family was of humble origins which was newly emergent only during Alai rule. Instead, in the Tughlaq Nama Tughlaq expressed his loyalty to the ethnically heterogenous Alai regime as his benefactor through which he first entered military service but makes no mention of Balban because his father was never part of Balban's old Sultanate household. The link with the region of Punjab was also exemplified in the support of the Punjabi Khokhar tribes to Ghazi Malik, who played the central role in his rise to the monarchy. His own court poet, Amir Khusro, wrote a war ballad known as the Vaar in the Punjabi language for the Sultan describing the introduction to his rise to the throne against Khusrau Shah. Tughlaq's administration was dominated by Punjabis from Southern Punjab, indicating their ties to the area and people.The city of Dipalpur in Punjab, according to Alexander Cunningham, was the favorite residence of the third successor of the dynasty, Sultan Firuz Shah, which may further support the view of their origins in the area.

Rise to power 

The Khalji dynasty ruled the Delhi Sultanate before 1320. Its last ruler, Khusro Khan, was a Hindu slave who had been forcibly converted to Islam and then served the Delhi Sultanate as the general of its army for some time. Khusro Khan, along with Malik Kafur, had led numerous military campaigns on behalf of Alauddin Khalji, to expand the Sultanate and plunder non-Muslim kingdoms in India.

After Alauddin Khalji's death from illness in 1316, a series of palace arrests and assassinations followed, with Khusro Khan coming to power in June 1320, after killing the licentious son of Alauddin Khalji, Mubarak Khalji, initiating a massacre of all members of the Khalji family and reverting from Islam. However, he lacked the support of the Muslim nobles and aristocrats of the Delhi Sultanate. Delhi's aristocracy invited Ghazi Malik, then the governor in Punjab under the Khaljis, to lead a coup in Delhi and remove Khusro Khan. In 1320, Ghazi Malik launched an attack with the use of an army of Khokhar tribesmen and killed Khusro Khan to assume power.

Chronology

Ghiyasuddin Tughlaq
After assuming power, Ghazi Malik renamed himself Ghiyasuddin Tughlaq – thus starting and naming the Tughlaq dynasty. He rewarded all those maliks, amirs and officials of Khalji dynasty who had rendered him a service and helped him come to power. He punished those who had rendered service to Khusro Khan, his predecessor. He lowered the tax rate on Muslims that was prevalent during Khalji dynasty, but raised the taxes on Hindus, wrote his court historian Ziauddin Barani, so that they might not be blinded by wealth or afford to become rebellious. He built a city six kilometers east of Delhi, with a fort considered more defensible against the Mongol attacks, and called it Tughlakabad.

In 1321, he sent his eldest son Jauna Khan, later known as Muhammad bin Tughlaq, to Deogir to plunder the Hindu kingdoms of Arangal and Tilang (now part of Telangana). His first attempt was a failure. Four months later, Ghiyasuddin Tughlaq sent large army reinforcements for his son asking him to attempt plundering Arangal and Tilang again. This time Jauna Khan succeeded. Arangal fell, was renamed to Sultanpur, and all plundered wealth, state treasury and captives were transferred from the captured kingdom to Delhi Sultanate.

The Muslim aristocracy in Lukhnauti (Bengal) invited Ghiyasuddin Tughlaq to extend his coup and expand eastwards into Bengal by attacking Shamsuddin Firoz Shah, which he did over 1324–1325 AD, after placing Delhi under control of his son Ulugh Khan, and then leading his army to Lukhnauti. Ghiyasuddin Tughlaq succeeded in this campaign. As he and his favorite son Mahmud Khan were returning from Lakhnauti to Delhi, Ghiyasuddin Tughlaq's eldest son Jauna Khan schemed to kill him inside a wooden structure (kushk) built without foundation and designed to collapse, making it appear as an accident. Historic documents state that the Sufi preacher and Jauna Khan had learnt through messengers that Ghiyasuddin Tughlaq had resolved to remove them from Delhi upon his return. Ghiyasuddin Tughlaq, along with Mahmud Khan, died inside the collapsed kushk in 1325 AD, while his eldest son watched. One official historian of Tughlaq court gives an alternate fleeting account of his death, as caused by a lightning bolt strike on the kushk. Another official historian, Al-Badāʾunī ʻAbd al-Kadir ibn Mulūk-Shāh, makes no mention of lightning bolt or weather, but explains the cause of structural collapse to be the running of elephants; Al-Badaoni includes a note of the rumor that the accident was pre-planned.

Patricide

According to many historians such as Ibn Battuta, al-Safadi, Isami, and Vincent Smith, Ghiyasuddin  was killed by his son Ulugh Juna Khan in 1325 AD.  Juna Khan ascended to power as Muhammad bin Tughlaq, and ruled for 26 years.

Muhammad bin Tughluq

During Muhammad bin Tughluq's rule, Delhi Sultanate temporarily expanded to most of the Indian subcontinent, its peak in terms of geographical reach. He attacked and plundered Malwa, Gujarat, Mahratta, Tilang, Kampila, Dhur-samundar, Mabar, Lakhnauti, Chittagong, Sunarganw and Tirhut. His distant campaigns were expensive, although each raid and attack on non-Muslim kingdoms brought new looted wealth and ransom payments from captured people. The extended empire was difficult to retain, and rebellions all over Indian subcontinent became routine.

He raised taxes to levels where people refused to pay any. In India's fertile lands between Ganges and Yamuna rivers, the Sultan increased the land tax rate on non-Muslims by tenfold in some districts, and twentyfold in others. Along with land taxes, dhimmis (non-Muslims) were required to pay crop taxes by giving up half or more of their harvested crop. These sharply higher crop and land tax led entire villages of Hindu farmers to quit farming and escape into jungles; they refused to grow anything or work at all. Many became robber clans. Famines followed. The Sultan responded with bitterness by expanding arrests, torture and mass punishments, killing people as if he was "cutting down weeds". Historical documents note that Muhammad bin Tughluq was cruel and severe not only with non-Muslims, but also with certain sects of Musalmans. He routinely executed Sayyids (Shia), Sufis, Qalandars, and other Muslim officials. His court historian Ziauddin Barni noted,

Muhammad bin Tughlaq chose the city of Deogiri in present-day Indian state of Maharashtra (renaming it to Daulatabad), as the second administrative capital of the Dehli Sultanate. He ordered a forced migration of the Muslim population of Dehli, including his royal family, the nobles, Syeds, Sheikhs and 'Ulema to settle in Daulatabad. The purpose of transferring the entire Muslim elite to Daulatabad was to enroll them in his mission of world conquest. He saw their role as propagandists who would adapt Islamic religious symbolism to the rhetoric of empire, and that the Sufis could by persuasion bring many of the inhabitants of the Deccan to become Muslim. Tughluq cruelly punished the nobles who were unwilling to move to Daulatabad, seeing their non-compliance of his order as equivalent to rebellion. According to Ferishta, when the Mongols arrived to Punjab, the Sultan returned the elite back to Dehli, although Daulatabad remained as an administrative centre. One result of the transfer of the elite to Daulatabad was the hatred of the nobility to the Sultan, which remained in their minds for a long time. The other result was that he managed to create a stable Muslim elite and result in the growth of the Muslim population of Daulatabad who did not return to Dehli, without which the rise of the Bahmanid kingdom to challenge Vijayanagara would not have been possible. These were a community of Urdu-speaking people of North Indian Muslims. Muhammad bin Tughlaq's adventures in the Deccan region also marked campaigns of destruction and desecration of Hindu and Jain temples, for example the Swayambhu Shiva Temple and the Thousand Pillar Temple.

Revolts against Muhammad bin Tughlaq began in 1327, continued over his reign, and over time the geographical reach of the Sultanate shrunk particularly after 1335. The Indian Muslim soldier Jalaluddin Ahsan Khan, a native of Kaithal in North India, founded the Madurai Sultanate in South India. The Vijayanagara Empire originated in southern India as a direct response to attacks from the Delhi Sultanate. The Vijayanagara Empire liberated southern India from the Delhi Sultanate. In 1336 Kapaya Nayak of the Musunuri Nayak defeated the Tughlaq army and reconquered Warangal from the Delhi Sultanate. In 1338 his own nephew rebelled in Malwa, whom he attacked, caught and flayed alive. By 1339, the eastern regions under local Muslim governors and southern parts led by Hindu kings had revolted and declared independence from Delhi Sultanate. Muhammad bin Tughlaq did not have the resources or support to respond to the shrinking kingdom. By 1347, Bahmanid Sultanate had become an independent and competing Muslim kingdom in Deccan region of South Asia, under the Indian Muslim adventurer, Hasan Gangu, who was a North Indian convert to Islam.

Muhammad bin Tughlaq was an intellectual, with extensive knowledge of Quran, Fiqh, poetry and other fields. He was deeply suspicious of his kinsmen and wazirs (ministers), extremely severe with his opponents, and took decisions that caused economic upheaval. For example, after his expensive campaigns to expand Islamic empire, the state treasury was empty of precious metal coins. So he ordered minting of coins from base metals with face value of silver coins – a decision that failed because ordinary people minted counterfeit coins from base metal they had in their houses.

Ziauddin Barni, a historian in Muhammad bin Tughlaq's court, wrote that the houses of Hindus became a coin mint and people in Hindustan provinces produced fake copper coins worth crores to pay the tribute, taxes and jizya imposed on them. The economic experiments of Muhammad bin Tughlaq resulted in a collapsed economy, and nearly a decade long famine followed that killed numerous people in the countryside. The historian Walford chronicled Delhi and most of India faced severe famines during Muhammad bin Tughlaq's rule, in the years after the base metal coin experiment. Tughlaq introduced token coinage of brass and copper to augment the silver coinage which only led to increasing ease of forgery and loss to the treasury. Also, the people were not willing to trade their gold and silver for the new brass and copper coins. Consequently, the sultan had to withdraw the lot, "buying back both the real and the counterfeit at great expense until mountains of coins had accumulated within the walls of Tughluqabad."

Muhammad bin Tughlaq planned an attack on Khurasan and Irak (Babylon and Persia) as well as China to bring these regions under Sunni Islam. For Khurasan attack, a cavalry of over 300,000 horses were gathered near Delhi, for a year at state treasury's expense, while spies claiming to be from Khurasan collected rewards for information on how to attack and subdue these lands. However, before he could begin the attack on Persian lands in the second year of preparations, the plunder he had collected from Indian subcontinent had emptied, provinces were too poor to support the large army, and the soldiers refused to remain in his service without pay. For the attack on China, Muhammad bin Tughlaq sent 100,000 soldiers, a part of his army, over the Himalayas. However, Hindus closed the passes through the Himalayas and blocked the passage for retreat. Kangra's Prithvi Chand II defeated the army of Muhammad bin Tughluq which was not able to fight in the hills. Nearly all his 100,000 soldiers perished in 1333 and were forced to retreat. The high mountain weather and lack of retreat destroyed that army in the Himalayas. The few soldiers who returned with bad news were executed under orders of the Sultan.

During his reign, state revenues collapsed from his policies. To cover state expenses, Muhammad bin Tughlaq sharply raised taxes on his ever-shrinking empire. Except in times of war, he did not pay his staff from his treasury. Ibn Battuta noted in his memoir that Muhammad bin Tughlaq paid his army, judges (qadi), court advisors, wazirs, governors, district officials and others in his service by awarding them the right to force collect taxes on Hindu villages, keep a portion and transfer rest to his treasury. Those who failed to pay taxes were hunted and executed. Muhammad bin Tughlaq died in March 1351 while trying to chase and punish people for rebellion and their refusal to pay taxes in Sindh (now in Pakistan) and Gujarat (now in India).

Historians have attempted to determine the motivations behind Muhammad bin Tughlaq's behavior and his actions. Some state Tughlaq tried to enforce orthodox Islamic observance and practice, promote jihad in South Asia as al-Mujahid fi sabilillah ('Warrior for the Path of God') under the influence of Ibn Taymiyyah of Syria. Others suggest insanity.

At the time of Muhammad bin Tughlaq's death, the geographic control of Delhi Sultanate had shrunk to the north of the Narmada river.

Feroz Shah Tughluq

After Muhammad bin Tughluq died, a collateral relative, Mahmud Ibn Muhammad, ruled for less than a month. Thereafter, Muhammad bin Tughluq's 45-year-old nephew Firuz Shah Tughlaq replaced him and assumed the throne. His rule lasted 37 years. His father Sipah Rajab had become infatuated with a Hindu princess named Naila. She initially refused to marry him. Her father refused the marriage proposal as well. Sultan Muhammad bin Tughlaq and Sipah Rajab then sent in an army with a demand for one year taxes in advance and a threat of seizure of all property of her family and Abohar people. The kingdom was suffering from famines, and could not meet the ransom demand. The princess, after learning about ransom demands against her family and people, offered herself in sacrifice if the army would stop the misery to her people. Sipah Rajab and the Sultan accepted the proposal. Sipah Rajab and Naila were married and Firoz Shah was their first son.

The court historian Ziauddin Barni, who served both Muhammad Tughlaq and the first six years of Firoz Shah Tughlaq, noted that all those who were in service of Muhammad were dismissed and executed by Firoz Shah. In his second book, Barni states that Firuz Shah was the mildest sovereign since the rule of Islam came to Delhi. Muslim soldiers enjoyed the taxes they collected from Hindu villages they had rights over, without having to constantly go to war as in previous regimes. Other court historians such as 'Afif record a number of conspiracies and assassination attempts on Firoz Shah Tughlaq, such as by his first cousin and the daughter of Muhammad bin Tughlaq.

Firoz Shah Tughlaq tried to regain the old kingdom boundary by waging a war with Bengal for 11 months in 1359. However, Bengal did not fall, and remained outside of Delhi Sultanate. Firuz Shah Tughlaq was somewhat weak militarily, mainly because of inept leadership in the army.

An educated sultan, Firoz Shah left a memoir. In it he wrote that he banned torture in practice in Delhi Sultanate by his predecessors, tortures such as amputations, tearing out of eyes, sawing people alive, crushing people's bones as punishment, pouring molten lead into throats, putting people on fire, driving nails into hands and feet, among others. The Sunni Sultan also wrote that he did not tolerate attempts by Rafawiz Shia Muslim and Mahdi sects from proselytizing people into their faith, nor did he tolerate Hindus who tried to rebuild their temples after his armies had destroyed those temples. As punishment, wrote the Sultan, he put many Shias, Mahdi and Hindus to death (siyasat). Shams-i Siraj 'Afif, his court historian, also recorded Firoz Shah Tughlaq burning a Hindu Brahmin alive for converting Muslim women to infidelity. In his memoirs, Firoz Shah Tughlaq lists his accomplishments to include converting Hindus to Sunni Islam by announcing an exemption from taxes and jizya for those who convert, and by lavishing new converts with presents and honours. Simultaneously, he raised taxes and jizya, assessing it at three levels, and stopping the practice of his predecessors who had historically exempted all Hindu Brahmins from jizya tax.  He also vastly expanded the number of slaves in his service and those of amirs (Muslim nobles). Firoz Shah Tughlaq reign was marked by reduction in extreme forms of torture, eliminating favours to select parts of society, but an increased intolerance and persecution of targeted groups. After the death of his heir in 1376 AD, Firuz Shah started strict implementation of Sharia throughout his dominions.

Firuz Shah suffered from bodily infirmities, and his rule was considered by his court historians as more merciful than that of Muhammad bin Tughlaq. When Firuz Shah came to power, India was suffering from a collapsed economy, abandoned villages and towns, and frequent famines. He undertook many infrastructure projects including an irrigation canal connecting Yamuna-Ghaggar and Yamuna-Sutlej rivers, bridges, madrasas (religious schools), mosques and other Islamic buildings. Firuz Shah Tughlaq is credited with patronizing Indo-Islamic architecture, including the installation of lats (ancient Hindu and Buddhist pillars) near mosques. The irrigation canals continued to be in use through the 19th century. After Feroz died in 1388, the Tughlaq dynasty's power continued to fade, and no more able leaders came to the throne. Firoz Shah Tughlaq's death created anarchy and disintegration of kingdom. In the years preceding his death, internecine strife among his descendants had already erupted.

Civil wars
The first civil war broke out in 1384 AD four years before the death of aging Firoz Shah Tughlaq, while the second civil war started in 1394 AD six years after Firoz Shah was dead. The Islamic historians Sirhindi and Bihamadkhani provide the detailed account of this period. These civil wars were primarily between different factions of Sunni Islam aristocracy, each seeking sovereignty and land to tax dhimmis and extract income from resident peasants.

Firuz Shah Tughluq's favorite grandson died in 1376. Thereafter, Firuz Shah sought and followed Sharia more than ever, with the help of his wazirs. He himself fell ill in 1384. By then, Muslim nobility who had installed Firuz Shah Tughluq to power in 1351 had died out, and their descendants had inherited the wealth and rights to extract taxes from non-Muslim peasants. Khan Jahan II, a wazir in Delhi, was the son of Firuz Shah Tughluq's favorite wazir Khan Jahan I, and rose in power after his father died in 1368 AD. The young wazir was in open rivalry with Muhammad Shah, the son of Firuz Shah Tughluq. The wazir's power grew as he appointed more amirs and granted favors. He persuaded the Sultan to name his great-grandson as his heir. Then Khan Jahan II tried to convince Firuz Shah Tughlaq to dismiss his only surviving son. Instead of dismissing his son, the Sultan dismissed the wazir. The crisis that followed led to first civil war, arrest and execution of the wazir, followed by a rebellion and civil war in and around Delhi. Muhammad Shah too was expelled in 1387 AD. The Sultan Firuz Shah Tughluq died in 1388 AD. Tughluq Khan assumed power, but died in conflict. In 1389, Abu Bakr Shah assumed power, but he too died within a year. The civil war continued under Sultan Muhammad Shah, and by 1390 AD, it had led to the seizure and execution of all Muslim nobility who were aligned, or suspected to be aligned to Khan Jahan II.

While the civil war was in progress, predominantly Hindu populations of Himalayan foothills of north India had rebelled, stopped paying Jizya and Kharaj taxes to Sultan's officials. Hindus of southern Doab region of India (now Etawah) joined the rebellion in 1390 AD. Sultan Muhammad Shah attacked Hindus rebelling near Delhi and southern Doab in 1392, with mass executions of peasants, and razing Etawah to the ground. However, by then, most of India had transitioned to a patchwork of smaller Muslim Sultanates and Hindu kingdoms. In 1394, Hindus in Lahore region and northwest South Asia (now Pakistan) had re-asserted self-rule. Muhammad Shah amassed an army to attack them, with his son Humayun Khan as the commander-in-chief. While preparations were in progress in Delhi in January 1394, Sultan Muhammad Shah died. His son, Humayun Khan assumed power but was murdered within two months. The brother of Humayun Khan, Nasir-al-din Mahmud Shah assumed power – but he enjoyed little support from Muslim nobility, the wazirs and amirs. The Sultanate had lost command over almost all eastern and western provinces of already shrunken Sultanate. Within Delhi, factions of Muslim nobility formed by October 1394 AD, triggering the second civil war.

Tartar Khan installed a second Sultan, Nasir-al-din Nusrat Shah in Firozabad, few kilometers from the first Sultan seat of power in late 1394. The two Sultans claimed to be rightful ruler of South Asia, each with a small army, controlled by a coterie of Muslim nobility. Battles occurred every month, duplicity and switching of sides by amirs became commonplace, and the civil war between the two Sultan factions continued through 1398, till the invasion by Timur.

Timur's Invasion

The lowest point for the dynasty came in 1398, when Turco-Mongol invader, Timur (Tamerlane) defeated four armies of the Sultanate. During the invasion, Sultan Mahmud Khan fled before Tamerlane as he entered Delhi. For eight days Delhi was plundered, its population massacred, and over 100,000 prisoners were killed as well.

The capture of the Delhi Sultanate was one of Timur's greatest victories, as at that time, Delhi was one of the richest cities in the world. After Delhi fell to Timur's army, uprisings by its citizens against the Turkic-Mongols began to occur, causing a retaliatory bloody massacre within the city walls. After three days of citizens uprising within Delhi, it was said that the city reeked of the decomposing bodies of its citizens with their heads being erected like structures and the bodies left as food for the birds by Timur's soldiers. Timur's invasion and destruction of Delhi continued the chaos that was still consuming India, and the city would not be able to recover from the great loss it suffered for almost a century.

It is believed that before his departure, Timur appointed Khizr Khan, the future founder of the succeeding Sayyid dynasty, as his viceroy at Delhi. Initially, Khizr Khan could only establish his control over Multan, Dipalpur and parts of Sindh. Soon he started his campaign against the Tughlaq dynasty, and entered Delhi victoriously on 6 June 1414.

Ibn Battuta's memoir on Tughlaq dynasty
Ibn Battuta, the Moroccan Muslim traveller, left extensive notes on Tughlaq dynasty in his travel memoirs. Ibn Battuta arrived in India through the mountains of Afghanistan, in 1334, at the height of Tughlaq dynasty's geographic empire. On his way, he learnt that Sultan Muhammad Tughluq liked gifts from his visitors, and gave to his visitors gifts of far greater value in return. Ibn Battuta met Muhammad bin Tughluq, presenting him with gifts of arrows, camels, thirty horses, slaves and other goods. Muhammad bin Tughlaq responded by giving Ibn Battuta with a welcoming gift of 2,000 silver dinars, a furnished house and the job of a judge with an annual salary of 5,000 silver dinars that Ibn Battuta had the right to keep by collecting taxes from two and a half Hindu villages near Delhi.

In his memoirs about Tughlaq dynasty, Ibn Batutta recorded the history of Qutb complex which included Quwat al-Islam Mosque and the Qutb Minar. He noted the seven-year famine from 1335 AD, which killed thousands upon thousands of people near Delhi, while the Sultan was busy attacking rebellions. He was tough both against non-Muslims and Muslims. For example,

In Tughlaq dynasty, the punishments were extended even to Muslim religious figures who were suspected rebellion. For example, Ibn Battuta mentions Sheikh Shinab al-Din, who was imprisoned and tortured as follows:

Ibn Batutta wrote that Sultan's officials demanded bribes from him while he was in Delhi, as well as deducted 10% of any sums that Sultan gave to him. Towards the end of his stay in Tughluq dynasty court, Ibn Battuta came under suspicion for his friendship with a Sufi Muslim holy man. Both Ibn Battuta and the Sufi Muslim were arrested. While Ibn Battuta was allowed to leave India, the Sufi Muslim was killed as follows according to Ibn Battuta during the period he was under arrest:

Slavery under Tughlaq dynasty

Each military campaign and raid on non-Muslim kingdoms yielded loot and seizure of slaves. Additionally, the Sultans patronized a market for trade of both foreign and Indian slaves. This market flourished under the reign of all Sultans of Tughlaq dynasty, particularly Ghiyasuddin Tughlaq, Muhammad Tughlaq and Firoz Tughlaq.

Ibn Battuta's memoir records that he fathered a child each with two slave girls, one from Greece and one he purchased during his stay in Delhi Sultanate. This was in addition to the daughter he fathered by marrying a Muslim woman in India. Ibn Battuta also records that Muhammad Tughlaq sent along with his emissaries, both slave boys and slave girls as gifts to other countries such as China.

Muslim nobility and revolts
The Tughlaq dynasty experienced many revolts by Muslim nobility, particularly during Muhammad bin Tughlaq but also during other rulers such as Firoz Shah Tughlaq.

The Tughlaqs had attempted to manage their expanded empire by appointing family members and Muslim aristocracy as na'ib of Iqta' (farming provinces) under contract. The contract would require that the na'ib shall have the right to force collect taxes from non-Muslim peasants and local economy, deposit a fixed sum of tribute and taxes to Sultan's treasury on a periodic basis. The contract allowed the na'ib to keep a certain amount of taxes they collected from peasants as their income, but the contract required any excess tax and seized property collected from non-Muslims to be split between na'ib and Sultan in a 20:80 ratio (Firuz Shah changed this to 80:20 ratio). The na'ib had the right to keep soldiers and officials to help extract taxes. After contracting with Sultan, the na'ib would enter into subcontracts with Muslim amirs and army commanders, each granted the right over certain villages to force collect or seize produce and property from dhimmis.

This system of tax extraction from peasants and sharing among Muslim nobility led to rampant corruption, arrests, execution and rebellion. For example, in the reign of Firoz Shah Tughlaq, a Muslim noble named Shamsaldin Damghani entered into a contract over the iqta' of Gujarat, promising enormous sums of annual tribute while entering the contract in 1377 AD. He then attempted to force collect the amount deploying his coterie of Muslim amirs, but failed. Even the amount he did manage to collect, he paid nothing to Delhi. Shamsaldin Damghani and Muslim nobility of Gujarat then declared rebellion and separation from Delhi Sultanate. However, the soldiers and peasants of Gujarat refused to fight the war for the Muslim nobility. Shamsaldin Damghani was killed. During the reign of Muhammad Shah Tughlaq, similar rebellions were very common. His own nephew rebelled in Malwa in 1338 AD; Muhammad Shah Tughlaq attacked Malwa, seized his nephew, and then flayed him alive in public.

Downfall
The provinces of Deccan, Bengal, Sindh and Multhan had become independent during the reign of Muhammad Bin Tughlaq. The invasion of Timur further weakened the Tughlaq empire and allowed several regional chiefs to become independent, resulting in the formation of the sultanates of Gujarat, Malwa and Jaunpur. The Rajput states also expelled the governor of Ajmer and asserted control over Rajputana. The Tughlaq power continued to decline until they were finally overthrown by their former governor of Multhan, Khizr Khan. Resulting in the rise of the Sayyid Dynasty as the new rulers of the Delhi Sultanate.

Indo-Islamic Architecture

The Sultans of Tughlaq dynasty, particularly Firoz Shah Tughlaq, patronized many construction projects and are credited with the development of Indo-Islamic architecture.

Rulers

The colored rows signify the splitting of Delhi Sultanate under two Sultans; one in the east (Orange) at Firozabad & the other in the west (Yellow) at Delhi.

See also

List of Turkic dynasties and countries
List of Sunni dynasties
Persianate states

References

Bibliography

External links 

 
States and territories established in 1321
States and territories disestablished in 1414
Turkic dynasties